Dunk Hill is a mountain located in the Catskill Mountains of New York west-southwest of Delhi. Lumbert Hill is located northeast and Palmer Hill is located west of Dunk Hill.

References

Mountains of Delaware County, New York
Mountains of New York (state)